The USWA Television Championship was a secondary title in the United States Wrestling Association that was primarily defended on USWA Championship Wrestling, which was the USWA's television show. It existed from 1996.

Title history

Footnotes

United States Wrestling Association championships
Television wrestling championships